Alma Delia Vázquez Acosta (born 9 August 1963) is a Mexican hurdler. She competed in the women's 400 metres hurdles at the 1984 Summer Olympics.

References

External links
 

1963 births
Living people
Athletes (track and field) at the 1983 Pan American Games
Athletes (track and field) at the 1984 Summer Olympics
Mexican female hurdlers
Olympic athletes of Mexico
Central American and Caribbean Games medalists in athletics
Pan American Games competitors for Mexico
Sportspeople from Guerrero
People from Chilpancingo
20th-century Mexican women
21st-century Mexican women